This is a list of notable people from Bahawalpur city and Bahawalpur District.

A 

 Abdul Rehman Makki, Lashkar-e-Taiba member
 Ajaz Akhtar, cricketer
 Muhammad Adil, Football Player
 Art Malik, British TV and film actor
 Azam Cheema, Muslim Ideology lover

C 

 Chaudhry Mumtaz Jajja politician

M 
 Masood Azhar
 Motiullah, field hockey player
 Murtaza Hassan (Mastana), TV actor and stand-up comedian
 Murtaza Hussain, cricketer

S 
 Shabbir Ahmad Usmani, Muslim Sufi and scholar
 Shahid Khan, Pakistani-American billionaire businessman

T 
 Tariq Bashir Cheema

Z 
 Zaka Ashraf, businessman and PCB chairman
 Zia Ahmed, cricketer

References 

Bahawalpur